Wellington Station is a residential community of the Halifax Regional Municipality in the Canadian province of Nova Scotia.

References
 Explore HRM
Wellington Station on Destination Nova Scotia

Communities in Halifax, Nova Scotia
General Service Areas in Nova Scotia